Nguyễn Thị Mỹ Hạnh (born 28 September 1997) is a Vietnamese freestyle wrestler. She is a gold medalist at the Southeast Asian Games and a bronze medalist at the Asian Games.

Career 

She won one of the bronze medals in the women's freestyle 62 kg event at the 2018 Asian Games held in Jakarta, Indonesia. At the time, she lost her bronze medal match against Risako Kawai of Japan but she was awarded the bronze medal after the original gold medal winner, Pürevdorjiin Orkhon of Mongolia, was stripped of her medal after testing positive for a banned substance.

In 2019, she won the gold medal in the women's 62 kg event at the Southeast Asian Games held in the Philippines.

Achievements

References

External links 
 

Living people
1997 births
Place of birth missing (living people)
Vietnamese female sport wrestlers
Asian Games medalists in wrestling
Asian Games bronze medalists for Vietnam
Wrestlers at the 2018 Asian Games
Medalists at the 2018 Asian Games
Southeast Asian Games gold medalists for Vietnam
Southeast Asian Games medalists in wrestling
Competitors at the 2019 Southeast Asian Games
20th-century Vietnamese women
21st-century Vietnamese women